The , , also referred to as the Japanese Air Force, is the air and space branch of the Japan Self-Defense Forces, responsible for the defense of Japanese airspace, other air and space operations, cyberwarfare and electronic warfare. The JASDF carries out combat air patrols around Japan, while also maintaining a network of ground and air early-warning radar systems. The branch also has an aerobatic team known as Blue Impulse and has provided air transport in UN peacekeeping missions.

The JASDF had an estimated 49,913 personnel as of 2018, and as of 2020 operates about 740 aircraft, approximately 330 of them being fighter aircraft.

As of 2020, the JASDF is under increasing pressure to intercept warplanes from China's People's Liberation Army Air Force (PLAAF) close to entering its air space. As of the last fiscal year ending in March 2020, the JASDF scrambled a record 947 times alone against PLAAF warplanes, putting heavy wear and tear on the F-15J. As of 2021, due to wear and tear on the JASDF F-15J, the JASDF no longer intercepts the majority of PLAAF warplanes and has deployed its F-35 fighter jets to supplement the F-15J fighter jets for interception duty.

History

Japan did not have a separate air force before and during World War II. Aviation operations were carried out by the Imperial Japanese Army Air Service and the Imperial Japanese Navy Air Service (Kōkūtai). Following defeat in World War II, the Imperial Japanese Army and Navy (including their respective Air Services) were disbanded in 1945.

Under the supervision of the United States occupation authorities, a pacifist Japanese government was appointed in place of the militaristic governments that administered the Empire of Japan during the war. The new government drafted a postwar constitution. While the primary intent of this endeavor was to place the country's political structure on a firmly democratic footing, the constitution endorsed by the United States and ratified by the Diet of Japan in 1947 also contained Article 9 which strictly prohibited Japan from having a regular military.

The U.S. occupation formally ended in 1952, although large American garrison remained in Japan to defend the country. The victory of the Chinese Communist Party in the Chinese Civil War and the onset of the Korean War led the Americans to reconsider what role the Japanese could be expected to play in, at the very least, defending their own home islands against growing Chinese, Soviet and North Korean power in the region. Under U.S. guidance, on 1 July 1954 the National Security Board was reorganized as the Defense Agency, and the National Security Force was reorganized afterwards as the Japan Ground Self-Defense Force (de facto post-war Japanese Army), the Coastal Safety Force was reorganized as the Japan Maritime Self-Defense Force (de facto post-war Japanese Navy) and the Japan Air Self-Defense Force (de facto post-war Japanese Air Force) was established as a new branch of JSDF. General Keizō Hayashi was appointed as the first Chairman of Joint Staff Council—professional head of the three branches. The enabling legislation for this was the 1954 Self-Defense Forces Act (Act No. 165 of 1954).

The Far East Air Force, U.S. Air Force, announced on 6 January 1955, that 85 aircraft would be turned over to the fledgling Japanese air force on about 15 January, the first equipment of the new force.

The JASDF Air Defense Command Headquarters was relocated from Fuchu Air Base to Yokota Air Base on March 26, 2012. The relocation is due to the 2002 Defense Policy Review Initiative. The purpose is to strengthen the U.S.-Japan Security Alliance. The ADC Headquarters does command and control operations to defend Japanese airspace.

Until 2015, women were banned from becoming fighter jet and reconnaissance aircraft pilots. The first female pilot of an F-15 joined the ranks, along with three other female pilots currently in training, in 2018.

Since 2008, the number of scrambles to intercept Chinese aircraft has increased rapidly. In 2010 there were scrambles against 31 Chinese aircraft and 193 Russian aircraft. In 2018 scrambles increased to against 638 Chinese aircraft and 343 Russian aircraft. Chinese aircraft flight paths are mostly in the East China Sea, around the Ryukyu islands and through the Korea Strait. Russia frequently conducts flights orbiting Japan with military aircraft.

The Ministry of Defense reported in fiscal 2018 that there were 999 scrambles by JASDF jets against mainly Chinese and Russian unidentified aircraft. That is the second highest amount of scrambles by the JASDF since 1958. 638 (64%) were Chinese aircraft and 343 (34%) were Russian aircraft. On June 20, 2019, two Russian bombers (Tupolev Tu-95) violated Japanese airspace twice on the same day.

The Diet of Japan approved the modification of the ships of the Izumo-class to operate STOVL aircraft and in 2019 ordered 42 STOVL Lockheed Martin F-35 Lightning IIs. The US Marines will operate their own STOVL F-35s from the Izumo-class in cooperation with the ship's crew to build up a Japanese capability to operate this type.  The current plan is for the Japan Air Self-Defense Force to operate the STOVL F-35B from land bases once delivered.

On 17 March 2021, the Mitsubishi F-4EJ Phantom II was retired after 50 years of service with the JASDF, being replaced by the F-35A.

During the 9 months of fiscal year 2021, JASDF fighters scrambled against 785 inbound flights. Chinese aircraft were intercepted 571 times (70%), and 199 Russian aircraft. The majority of the Chinese aircraft flew over Okinawa prefecture.

Organization

Major units of the JASDF are the Air Defense Command, Air Support Command, Air Training Command, Air Development and Test Command, and Air Materiel Command. The Air Support Command is responsible for direct support of operational forces in rescue, transportation, control, weather monitoring and inspection. The Air Training Command is responsible for basic flying and technical training. The Air Development and Test Command, in addition to overseeing equipment research and development, is also responsible for research and development in such areas as flight medicine. On May 19, 2020 the JASDF officially inaugurated its Space Operation Squadron.

The Air Defense Command has northern, central, and western regional headquarters located at Misawa, Iruma, and Kasuga, respectively and the Southwestern Composite Air Division based at Naha, Okinawa Prefecture. All four regional headquarters control surface-to-air missile units of both the JASDF and the JGSDF located in their respective areas.

Prime Minister of Japan
Minister of Defense
JASDF Chief of Staff / Air Staff Office
Air Defense Command: Yokota, Fussa, Tokyo
Northern Air Defense Force: Misawa, Aomori
2nd Air Wing (Chitose Air Base: 201SQ, F-15J/DJ, T-4; 203SQ, F-15J/DJ, T-4)
3rd Air Wing (Misawa Air Base: 301SQ, F-35A, T-4; 302SQ, F-35A, T-4)
Northern Air Command Support Flight, (Misawa, T-4)
Northern Aircraft Control & Warning Wing
3rd Air Defense Missile Group
6th Air Defense Missile Group
Central Air Defense Force: Iruma, Saitama
6th Air Wing (Komatsu Air Base: 303SQ, F-15J/DJ, T-4; 306SQ, F-15J/DJ, T-4)
7th Air Wing (Hyakuri Air Base: 3SQ, F-2A/B T-4)
Central Air Command Support Squadron (Iruma Air Base T-4, U-4)
Central Aircraft Control & Warning Wing
1st Air Defense Missile Group
4th Air Defense Missile Group
Iwo Jima Air Base Group
Western Air Defense Force: Kasuga, Fukuoka
5th Air Wing (Nyutabaru Air Base: 305SQ, F-15J/DJ, T-4)
8th Air Wing (Tsuiki Air Base: 6SQ, F-2A/B, T-4; 8SQ, F-2A/B, T-4)
Western Air Command Support Squadron, (Kasuga, T-4)
Western Aircraft Control & Warning Wing
2nd Air Defense Missile Group
Southwestern Air Defense Force: Naha, Okinawa
9th Air Wing (Naha Air Base: 204SQ, F-15J/DJ, T-4; 304SQ, F-15J/DJ, T-4
Southwestern Air Command Support Squadron, T-4)
Southwestern Aircraft Control & Warning Wing
5th Air Defense Missile Group
Airborne Early Warning and Control Wing: Hamamatsu Air Base )
Flight Warning and Control Group: Hamamatsu Air Base
602SQ, E-767
Operation Information Squadron
Flight Alert Monitoring Group: Misawa Air Base
601SQ, E-2C/D: Misawa Air Base
603SQ, E-2C/D:  Naha Air Base
1st Maintenance Group
2nd Maintenance Group
Air Tactics Development Wing (Yokota Air Base)
Tactical Fighter Training Group: Komatsu Air Base (F-15DJ/J, T-4)
Electronic Warfare Squadron Iruma Air Base (EC-1, YS-11EB)
Electronic Intelligence Squadron Iruma Air Base (YS-11EB)
Air Rescue Wing 
Detachments: Chitose, Matsushima, Ashiya, Akita, Hyakuri, Nyutabaru, Niigata, Hamamatsu, Naha, Komatsu, Komaki (Training Squadron) (UH-60J, U-125A)
Helicopter Airlift Squadrons: Iruma (CH-47J (LR)), Kasuga (CH-47J (LR)), Misawa (CH-47J (LR)), Naha (CH-47J (LR))
Air Defense Missile Training Group: Hamamatsu, Chitose
Air Support Command: Fuchū Air Base, Tokyo
1st Tactical Airlift Group (Komaki Air Base: 401SQ, C-130H, KC-130H; 404SQ, KC-767)
2nd Tactical Airlift Group (Iruma Air Base: 402SQ, C-1, U-4)
3rd Tactical Airlift Group (Miho Air Base: 403SQ, C-1, C-2; 41SQ, T-400)
Air Traffic Control Service Group
Air Weather Group
Flight Check Squadron (Iruma Air Base: U-125)
Special Airlift Group: (701SQ Chitose Air Base: B747-47C as Japanese Air Force One)
Air Training Command: Hamamatsu, Shizuoka
1st Air Wing (Hamamatsu Air Base: 31SQ, T-4; 32SQ, T-4)
4th Air Wing (Matsushima Air Field: F-2B; 11SQ, T-4 Blue Impulse 21SQ)
11th Flying Training Wing (Shizuhama Air Base: 1SQ, T-7; 2SQ, T-7)
12th Flight Training Wing (Hofu kita Air Base: 1SQ, T-7; 2SQ, T-7)
13th Flight Training Wing (Ashiya Air Base: 1SQ, T-4; 2SQ, T-4)
Fighter Training Group (Nyutabaru Air Base: 23SQ (Ex-202SQ), F-15DJ, T-4)
1st, 2nd, 3rd, 4th & 5th Technical School
Air Basic Training Wing
Air Training Aids Group
Air Officer Candidate School
Air Development and Test Command: Iruma Air Base, Saitama
Air Development and Test Wing (Gifu Air Base: F-15J/DJ, F-2A/B, C-1FTB, C-2, T-7, T-4)
Electronics Development and Test Group
Aeromedical Laboratory
Air Material Command: Jujou, Tokyo
1st, 2nd, 3rd & 4th Air Depot
Air Staff College
Air Communications and Systems Wing
Aerosafety Service Group
Central Air Base Group
Space Operations Squadron
Others

Ranks

Commissioned officer ranks
The rank insignia of commissioned officers.

Other ranks
The rank insignia of non-commissioned officers and enlisted personnel.

Equipment

The JASDF maintains an integrated network of radar installations and air defense direction centers throughout the country known as the Basic Air Defense Ground Environment. In the late 1980s, the system was modernized and augmented with E-2C Hawkeye airborne early warning aircraft. The nation relies on fighter-interceptor aircraft and surface-to-air missiles to intercept hostile aircraft. Both of these systems were improved from the beginning of the late 1980s. Outmoded aircraft were replaced in the early 1990s with more sophisticated models, and Nike-J missiles have been replaced with the modern Patriot PAC-2 and PAC-3 system and M167 VADS. The JASDF also provides air support for ground and sea operations of the JGSDF and the JMSDF and air defense for bases of all the forces. Base defenses were upgraded in the late 1980s with new surface-to-air missiles, modern antiaircraft artillery and new fixed and mobile aircraft shelters.

Aircraft

Culture and traditions

JASDF Flag
The Japan Air Self-Defense Force flag was first adopted in 1955 after the JASDF was created in 1954. It is based on a cap badge made in 1954. The flag is cobalt blue with a gold winged eagle on top of a combined star, the moon, the Hinomaru sun disc and clouds. The latest version of the JASDF flag was re-adopted on 19 March 2001. The JASDF flag is different from the JSDF flag and the JGSDF flag. It is determined by a directive regarding the flags of the JSDF.

Food
The dish of the JASDF is deep-fried chicken karaage, such as Okinawan-style deep-fried chicken. The JASDF tried to increase its popularity by promoting its fried chicken recipe since 2018. There were competitions between the JMSDF's popular curry.

See also

Fighter units of the Japan Air Self-Defense Force
Japan Maritime Self-Defense Force aviation
Military ranks and insignia of the Japan Self-Defense Forces

References

External links 

 

 
Air forces by country